The 1993 Virginia Cavaliers football team represented the University of Virginia during the 1993 NCAA Division I-A football season. The Cavaliers were led by 12th-year head coach George Welsh and played their home games at Scott Stadium in Charlottesville, Virginia. They competed as members of the Atlantic Coast Conference, finishing tied for third. Virginia was invited to the Carquest Bowl, played on New Years Day, where they lost to Boston College.

Schedule

Roster

References

Virginia
Virginia Cavaliers football seasons
Virginia Cavaliers football